Matheus dos Santos Clemente (born 10 June 1998) is a Portuguese professional footballer who plays as a midfielder for Cypriot First Division club Akritas Chlorakas.

Club career
On 28 August 2019, Clemente signed a professional contract with Famalicão. Clemente made his professional debut with Famalicão in a 5-1 league loss to Benfica on 18 September 2020.

On 8 August 2021, he moved to Felgueiras.

Personal life
Clemente's father, Marcão, was also a footballer who played for Famalicão.

References

External links
 
 

1998 births
Living people
Brazilian footballers
Association football midfielders
A.R. São Martinho players
F.C. Famalicão players
S.C. Olhanense players
F.C. Felgueiras 1932 players
PFC Cherno More Varna players
Campeonato de Portugal (league) players
Primeira Liga players
Brazilian expatriate footballers
Brazilian expatriate sportspeople in Portugal
Expatriate footballers in Portugal
Expatriate footballers in Bulgaria